was a Japanese football player. He played for Japan national team.

Club career
Sueoka was born in Hiroshima Prefecture on February 1, 1917. He played for Waseda University. He won 1938 Emperor's Cup with Sei Fuwa, Sekiji Sasano, Shogo Kamo, Hidetoki Takahashi and so on. He also won the 2nd place at 1939 Emperor's Cup. He also played for Waseda WMW was consisted of his alma mater Waseda University players and graduates. At the club, he won the 2nd place at 1940 Emperor's Cup. This tournament was the last Emperor's Cup before the war because Emperor's Cup was suspended for World War II from 1941 to 1945.

National team career
On June 16, 1940, when Sueoka was a Waseda University student, he debuted for Japan national team against Philippines and Japan won the match. This match was the first match since 1936 Summer Olympics and the only match in the 1940s in Japan's International A Match due to World War II.

Sueoka died in November 1998 at the age of 81.

National team statistics

References

External links
 
 Japan National Football Team Database

1917 births
1998 deaths
Waseda University alumni
Association football people from Hiroshima Prefecture
Japanese footballers
Japan international footballers
Association football defenders